Rhabdochaeta naevia is a species of tephritid fruit flies in the genus Rhabdochaeta.

Distribution
Japan

References

Tephritinae
Insects described in 1984
Diptera of Asia